Monkseaton is a Tyne and Wear Metro station, serving the suburb of Monkseaton, North Tyneside in Tyne and Wear, England. It joined the network on 11 August 1980, following the opening of the first phase of the network, between Haymarket and Tynemouth via Four Lane Ends.

History
Monkseaton has been served by a station since June 1864, with the station at the current site opened in July 1915, under the North Eastern Railway. Following closure for conversion in the late 1970s, much of the original North Eastern Railway station building, dating from 1915, was retained. However, the southbound platform (trains towards South Shields) and buildings were demolished and replaced.

Monkseaton was recently refurbished, along with Cullercoats and West Monkseaton, in 2018, as part of the Metro: All Change programme. The refurbishment involved the installation of new seating and lighting, resurfaced platforms, and improved security and accessibility. The station was also painted in to the new black and white corporate colour scheme.

Facilities 
The station has two platforms, both of which have ticket machines (which accept cash, card and contactless payment), smartcard validators, waiting shelter, seating, next train audio and visual displays, timetable and information posters and an emergency help point. The station building houses a restaurant, shop and micropub. There is step-free access to both platforms, with platforms linked by road bridge. The station has free car park, with 22 spaces (plus one accessible space). There is also cycle storage at the station, with ten cycle pods.

Services 
, the station is served by up to five trains per hour on weekdays and Saturday, and up to four trains per hour during the evening and on Sunday between South Shields and St James via Whitley Bay.

Rolling stock used: Class 599 Metrocar

Art
 Beach & Shipyards (1983) is an installation of two stained glass works, designed by Mike Davies, which have been incorporated into each end of the original glazed canopy, protecting passengers on the platform from the weather.

References

Notes

External links
 
 Timetable and station information for Monkseaton

Metropolitan Borough of North Tyneside
1915 establishments in England
Railway stations in Great Britain opened in 1915
1980 establishments in England
Railway stations in Great Britain opened in 1980
Tyne and Wear Metro Yellow line stations
Transport in Tyne and Wear
Former North Eastern Railway (UK) stations
